The 2010 Southeastern Conference football season began on Thursday, September 2, 2010 with South Carolina defeating Southern Miss on ESPN.

Preseason
Tennessee head coach Lane Kiffin left after his first season in Knoxville for Southern Cal.  Kiffin was replaced by Louisiana Tech head coach Derek Dooley. Dooley opened his first season on September 4 against University of Tennessee – Martin.

Kentucky head coach Rich Brooks retired after seven seasons in Lexington, ending a coaching career that lasted over 40 years. As agreed on in 2008, Brooks was replaced by his offensive coordinator Joker Phillips, who began his first season as head coach on September 4 against archrival Louisville.

In July 2010, Vanderbilt head coach Bobby Johnson unexpectedly retired. He was replaced on an interim basis by Robbie Caldwell, who had the dual titles of Vanderbilt assistant head coach and offensive line coach in 2009. Caldwell made his Vanderbilt head coaching debut on September 4 against Northwestern.

2010 Pre-season Coaches All-SEC

Rankings

Kentucky, Ole Miss, Tennessee, and Vanderbilt went unranked throughout the season in the rankings shown below (AP and Coaches polls, and BCS standings).

Regular season 

All times Eastern time.

Rankings reflect that of the AP poll for that week until week eight when the BCS rankings will be used.

Week One 

Players of the week:

Week Two 

Players of the week:

Week Three 

Players of the week:

Week Four 

Players of the week:

Week Five 

Players of the week:

Week Six 

Players of the week:

Week Seven 

Players of the week:

Week Eight 

Players of the week:

Week Nine 

Players of the week:

Week Ten 

Players of the week:

Week Eleven 

Players of the week:

Week Twelve 

Players of the week:

Week Thirteen 

Players of the week:

Week Fourteen (SEC Championship Game)

SEC vs. BCS conference opponents
NOTE:. Games with a * next to the home team represent a neutral site game

Bowl games

Post-season awards and honors

All-SEC 
The following players were named by the AP All-SEC team:

All-Americans 

Quarterback
Cam Newton, Auburn (AFCA-Coaches, AP, Walter Camp, CBS, Rivals.com, Scout.com, SI)

Defensive tackle
Nick Fairley, Auburn (AP, FWAA, Walter Camp, CBS, Rivals.com, Scout.com, SI)
Drake Nevis, LSU (CBS)

Wide receiver
Alshon Jeffery, South Carolina (AFCA-Coaches, FWAA, Rivals.com, Scout.com)

Linebacker
Justin Houston, Georgia (FWAA)

Offensive tackle
Lee Ziemba, Auburn (AFCA-Coaches, FWAA, SI, Walter Camp)

Secondary
Mark Barron, Alabama (FWAA)
Ahmad Black, Florida (CBS, Rivals.com)
Patrick Peterson, LSU (AFCA-Coaches, AP, FWAA, Walter Camp, CBS, Rivals.com, Scout.com, SI)

All-purpose
Randall Cobb, Kentucky (AP, SI)

Kicker/Punter
Chas Henry, Florida (AP, Walter Camp, CBS, Rivals.com, Scout.com, SI)
Josh Jasper LSU (FWAA)

National award winners 
The following SEC players listed below have been named to the national award semifinalist and finalist lists.

2010 Heisman Trophy Winner:
 Cameron Newton, Auburn

2010 Bednarik Award Winner:
 Patrick Peterson, LSU

2010 Lombardi Award Winner:
 Nick Fairley, Auburn

2010 Maxwell Award Winner:
 Cameron Newton, Auburn

2010 Walter Camp Award Winner:
 Cameron Newton, Auburn

2010 John Mackey Award Winner:
 DJ Williams, Arkansas

2010 Davey O'Brien Award Winner:
 Cameron Newton, Auburn

2010 Paul Hornung Award Finalist:
 Randall Cobb, Kentucky

References